Miarinarivo is a district of Itasy in Madagascar. It is located approximately 100 km east of Antananarivo.

Municipalities
The district is formed by 12 municipalities:

 Ambatomanjaka
 Analavory
 Andolofotsy
 Anosibe Ifanja
 Manazary
 Mandiavato
 Miarinarivo
 Miarinarivo II
 Sarobaratra Ifanja
 Soamahamanina
 Soavimbahoaka
 Zoma Bealoka

Sights
 Geysers in Analavory.
 Lily falls of the Sakay River near Ampefy.

References 

Districts of Itasy Region